Ekushey Padak (lit. "Twentyfirst Award") is the second highest civilian award in Bangladesh, introduced in memory of the martyrs of the Bengali Language Movement of 1952. The award is given to recognize contributions in a number of fields, including culture, education, and economics. The Ministry of Cultural Affairs administers the award.

The award consists of an 18 carat gold medal weighing 3 tolas and a certificate of honour. The medal was designed by the artist Nitun Kundu. The amount of the cash reward was originally ৳ 25,000, but it was subsequently increased to ৳ 100,000 in 2015. Next it was increased to tk 2,00,000 in 2017 and to tk 4,00,000 as of November 2019.

Etymology
The name Ekushey is important to Bengali nationalism, referring to 21 February 1952, commemorated as Language Movement Day and International Mother Language Day, when students campaigning for official status of the Bengali language within Pakistan were killed by police.

Method of giving Ekushey Padak
In the case of Ekushey Padak, following methods are followed.

 All the ministries / divisions, deputy commissioners and the Ministry of Culture, under the attachment table, are requested to give a proposal to the Directorate / Department / Organization and the award of prizes to the public universities. All electronic and print press releases are published to get the names of eligible people to receive this award or nomination. In addition, full information was published on the information ministry website.
 Those who have previously received Ekushey Padak or Independence Medal can send nomination proposals to qualified individuals or organizations.
 The proposers have to mention about their proposed person about 350 words in their short biography and in the organization, the identity of the organization (including proofs).
 The National Committee on Citizenship and Cultural Affairs, the sub-committee selects the primary list for selection of Ekushey Padak nomination or submits the appropriate person or organization to the Prime Minister in the consideration of the cabinet committee.
 If the Prime Minister approves, the name of the person (class) / institution (s) selected in the radio, television and newspapers in the first week of February is published. Earlier, the ministry of culture will contact the person / organization (posthumous paternal or his / her / her successor) in the respective medal and accept the acceptance of medal from them.
 If a person / institution refuses to accept the medal or does not have their opinion at the particular time, then it will be reported to the cabinet division. Name of that person / organization will not be included in the final list of medals and their names will not be declared as medals.
 The Honorable President / Prime Minister will lift the Ekushey Padak in the year when the names of the recipients will be announced.

Fields of the Ekushey Padak

Ekushey Padak in Art
Ekushey Padak in Art  is given to recognize the unique contribution of music, charisma, dance, drama and films of Bangladesh. In 1977, for the first time, Ekushey Padak was introduced in the beginning Abdul Alim, Altaf Mahmud, Gul Mohammad Khan, Ferdousi Rahman, Zaheer Raihan and Rashid Choudhury Ekushey Padak in Art was given.

Ekushey Padak in Economy
Ekushey Padak in Economy is  given to recognize the unique contribution of Bangladesh's economy by Bangladeshi citizens. In 2013, for the first time, Ekushey Padak was introduced, and first Bangladeshi to receive the award was Dr. Moynul Islam.

Ekushey Padak in Education
Ekushey Padak in Education is given to recognize of Bangladesh the unique contributions of the education system. In 1976, for the first time, Ekushey Padak was introduced in the beginning Muhammad Qudrat-i-Khuda and Muhammad Mansur Uddin Ekushey Padak in Education was given.

Ekushey Padak in Journalism
Ekushey Padak in Journalism is given to recognize the unique contribution of journalism. In 1976, for the first time, Ekushey Padak was introduced in the beginning Tofazzal Hossain Manik Miah, Abul Kalam Shamsuddin and Abdus Salam Ekushey Padak in Journalism was given.

Ekushey Padak in Language Movement
Ekushey Padak in Language Movement is one of the main fields of the Ekushey Padak. It is an national given to recognize the contribution of Bangla Language Movement in 1952. In 2000 Language Martyr Barkat, Language Martyr Jabbar, Language Martyr Salam, Language Martyr Rafiq, Language Martyr Shafiur and language soldier Gaziul Haque for the first time was given Ekushey Padak in the Language Movement.

Ekushey Padak in War of Liberation
Ekushey Padak in War of Liberation is one of the main fields of the Ekushey Padak. It is an national given to recognize the contribution of 1971's Bangladesh Liberation War. In 2013, Social Welfare Minister Enamul Haque Mostafa Shahid For the first time, Ekushey Padak was given in Liberation War.

Ekushey Padak in Literature
Ekushey Padak in Literature is given to people belonging to literature in Bengali language to give recognition to their unique contribution. In 1976, for the first time, Ekushey Padak was introduced in the beginning Kazi Nazrul Islam, Jasim Uddin, Abdul Quadir and Sufia Kamal Ekushey Padak in Literature was given.

Ekushey Padak in Research
Ekushey Padak in Research is given to recognize the unique contribution of Research of Bangladesh. In 2003, for the first time, Ekushey Padak was introduced in the beginning Abdul Mannan Syed Ekushey Padak in Research was given.

Ekushey Padak in Science and Technology
Ekushey Padak in Science and Technology is given by the Government of Bangladesh. This award given to the recognize the unique contributions in science and technology by Bangladeshi citizens. In 2000, for the first time, Ekushey Padak was introduced, and first Bangladeshi to receive the award was Jamal Nazrul Islam.

Ekushey Padak in Social service
Ekushey Padak in Social service is given by the Government of Bangladesh. This award is given to recognize the unique contribution of social service by Bangladeshi citizens. In 2000, for the first time, Ekushey Padak was introduced in the beginning Mohiuddin Ahmed Ekushey Padak in Social service was given.

Awards by decade

 List of Ekushey Padak award recipients (1976–79)
 List of Ekushey Padak award recipients (1980–89)
 List of Ekushey Padak award recipients (1990–99)
 List of Ekushey Padak award recipients (2000–09)
 List of Ekushey Padak award recipients (2010–19)
 List of Ekushey Padak award recipients (2020–29)

References

External links
 

 
Civil awards and decorations of Bangladesh
Bangladeshi media awards
Bengali language movement
Awards established in 1976
1976 establishments in Bangladesh